Fix or FIX may refer to:

People with the name
 Fix (surname)

Arts, entertainment, and media

Films
 Fix (film), a feature film by Tao Ruspoli

Music
 Fix (album), 2015 album by Chris Lane
 "Fix" (Blackstreet song), 1997 song by Blackstreet
 "Fix" (Chris Lane song), 2015 song by Chris Lane
 "Fix", a song from industrial metal band Static-X's 1999 album Wisconsin Death Trip

Business and government
 Federal Internet Exchange, network peering points between US agency networks
 Financial Information eXchange, a communications and messaging protocol

Science and medicine
 Factor IX, a coagulation factor
 Spaying and neutering, also called "fixing", sterilization of an animal

Other uses
 Fix (beer), a Greek beer
 Fix (position), a position determined by navigation
 Fix, a term used in problem-solving
 Fix, a term referring to maintenance, repair, and operations
 "Fix", an addictive drug, hence "fixing" or "getting your fix", taking addictive drugs (from the 1960s)
 Fixed point combinator, in mathematics

See also
 
 
F9 (disambiguation), including a list of topics named F.IX, etc.
Fixation (disambiguation)
Fixed (disambiguation)
Fixer (disambiguation)
Fixing (disambiguation)
Fix-up (disambiguation)
The Fix (disambiguation)
The Fix Is In (disambiguation)